Beach Boy (1997) is the debut novel of Indian novelist Ardashir Vakil. It is a coming-of-age story (bildungsroman) set in 1970s Bombay, the novel won the Betty Trask Award. It was first published by Penguin Books.

Further reading
 Beach Boy rated at Good Reads

References

Indian bildungsromans
Novels set in Mumbai
Fiction set in the 1970s
1997 Indian novels
1997 debut novels